The Bank of Canada Museum (since July 2017), formerly known as Canada's Currency Museum, opened in 1980 on the ground floor of the Bank of Canada building in Ottawa, Ontario, Canada. Temporarily closed in 2013 for major building renovations, the museum reopened in a new space on July 1, 2017, in a new building, with a completely new design and concept.  It is, however, connected to the main building through the Bank of Canada's underground conference centre. 

The museum used to be the public face of the National Currency Collection, which contains over 100,000 currency-related artifacts from around the world. These include coins, banknotes, dies, plates, and engraving tools, bank and government ledgers, weights and scales, cash registers, wallets, numismatic medals and cards and examples of counterfeit money. This collection was on display until 2013, and currently, most of it is in storage and is not available to visitors. 

As of February 2021, the museum is working on replacing these artifacts, both by putting them out, and digitizing them.

The National Currency Collection also encompasses a library and archive, which contain over 8,500 books, pamphlets, catalogues and journals dating back to the Middle Ages.

The Museum offers various educational programs for school groups and the public, in both English and French.

History

The creation of a national currency collection was first proposed in the late 1950s by Bank Governor James Coyne.

Numismatic consultant G.R.L. Potter was hired in 1959 to help develop the collection. Under his guidance the Bank began collecting artifacts that depicted the development of Canadian currency over the previous 150 years.

By 1962 Sheldon S. Carroll had been hired as the Bank's first Curator.  Governor Louis Rasminsky directed Carroll to develop as complete as possible a collection of Canadian coins, tokens and paper money. Carroll  also established collections of ancient, medieval and modern foreign currency, and of artifacts related to banking and monetary matters. The core of the Collection was assembled during this period.

Artifacts were acquired from individual collectors, private-sector firms and public agencies. The collection of J. Douglas Ferguson, perhaps the best-known Canadian numismatist of his time, was purchased  in 1963. This acquisition included paper money issued during the French regime, and a selection of ancient, medieval and contemporary coins.

Another significant acquisition came in 1965 with the transfer of a large collection of coins from the Public Archives of Canada. These included the Hart Collection, which had been purchased by the Canadian government in 1883.

In 1974 the Bank purchased a large collection from the Château de Ramezay, home of the Numismatic and Antiquarian Society of Montréal, Canada's first numismatic society. This acquisition included the  collection of R.W. McLachlan, Canada's leading numismatist of the late 19th and early 20th centuries.

In 1977 the Canadian Secretary of State formally designated the Bank's acquisitions as the National Currency Collection.

The museum opened its doors to the public in the newly expanded Bank of Canada Building on December 5, 1980. On July 2, 2013, the museum was closed for four years, while the Bank of Canada building was remodelled. On July 1, 2017, it re-opened as the Bank of Canada Museum.

Exhibits 
The new museum consists of many exhibits. They are aimed at both children, and adults. It contains currency from around the world, although generally Canadian.

Temporary exhibits are usually replaced every few months. The most recent examples, were of Viola Desmond, and luck [as in lucky coins, and luck related to currency in general (wishing wells)].

To view most exhibits, and artifacts, visitors are encouraged create a virtual 'avatar'. Visitors will receive a wristband, which will connect to computers to see interactive, and digitized artifacts and exhibits.

An example of an interactive artifact is the '2% inflation Rate' game. Visitors can play an interactive Space Invaders-like game, where you have to shoot targets relating to inflation rates.

Visitors can also create their own "currency", with their learned knowledge from the exhibits. Cartoon-style characters are used.

Affiliations
The Museum is affiliated with CMA, CHIN, and the Virtual Museum of Canada.

References

External links

 History of the earliest forms currency in Canada
 Banknotes of Canada at Will's Online World Paper Money Gallery

Museums in Ottawa
Numismatic museums in North America
Museums of economics
Bank of Canada
1980 establishments in Ontario
Museums established in 1980